Orphan Black is a Canadian science fiction television series that premiered on March 30, 2013, in Canada on Space. The series was created by Graeme Manson and John Fawcett, and stars Tatiana Maslany as several clones. The rest of the starring cast includes Dylan Bruce, Jordan Gavaris, Kevin Hanchard, Michael Mando, Maria Doyle Kennedy, Evelyne Brochu, Ari Millen, Kristian Bruun and Josh Vokey.

On June 16, 2016, the series was renewed for a fifth and final ten-episode season, which premiered on June 10, 2017, and concluded on August 12, 2017.

Series overview

Episodes

Season 1 (2013)
All titles of the first season are terms from On the Origin of Species by Charles Darwin.

Season 2 (2014)
All titles of the second season are quotes from the works of Sir Francis Bacon.

Season 3 (2015)
All titles of the third season are quotes from the farewell address of Dwight Eisenhower. The premiere episode debuted on all five of AMC Networks' cable channels–BBC America, AMC, IFC, SundanceTV and WE tv–and received 1.27 million cumulative viewers across all five airings. Likewise, in Canada, the season premiere was simulcast on Space, CTV, Bravo, and MTV Canada.

Season 4 (2016)
All season 4 titles are quotes from the works of Donna Haraway.

Season 5 (2017)
All season 5 titles are quotes from the poem "Protest" by Ella Wheeler Wilcox.

Ratings

References

External links
 Orphan Black at CTV
 Orphan Black at BBC America
 

 
Lists of Canadian drama television series episodes
Lists of Canadian television series episodes
Lists of science fiction television series episodes